Jhalawar State was a princely state in India during the British Raj. It was located in the Hadoti region. The main town in the state was Jhalawar.

The state belonged to the Kotah-Jhalawar Agency which had headquarters at Kota and was a subdivision of the Rajputana Agency.

History
In 1771, a subsequent Raja of Kota died, leaving an infant as his heir, and the regency was settled upon Zalim Singh, a descendant of Madhu Singh. From that time, Zalim Singh became effectively the real ruler of Kota. He did not surrender power even when his young charge came of age, and continued to rule the state, effortlessly dominating the raja of Kota and reducing him to the status of a virtual non-entity. Unfortunate as this circumstance was, it is also true that Zalim Singh was an outstanding administrator and an astute negotiator. Under his administration, which lasted for over forty-five years, the state attained an acme of prosperity and was well-regarded by all its neighbours. It was also during these years that Kota entered into treaty relations with the British; Zalim Singh established excellent personal relations with the British. In the Holkar state, the revenues from areas that yielded 74 lakhs in 1750s yielded just 6 lakhs under Holkar Darbar nobles while three districts under Ijardari of Zalim Singh yielded 13 lakhs revenues that literally fed the Holkar royal family keeping it out of penury. Kotah state under previous rulers yielded less than 15 lakhs in revenues yielded 55 lakhs under Zalim Singh Kotah (Todd, Annals and Antiquities of Rajpootana).

The flip side of these achievements was that Zalim Singh himself attained a status of respectability exceeding that of his nominal overlord, the young Raja of Kota, and enjoyed leverage with the British that the Raja of Kota did not. It is due above all to this influence with the British that it was resolved in 1838, with the grudging consent of the chief of Kota, to dismember the state and create a new principality, which would be ruled by the descendants of Zalim Singh. Whereas for many decades, the family of Zalim Singh had held large estates in fief of the state of Kota, and held important positions at court, they were now to be invested with royalty and become the rulers of their own state. The state of Jhalawar was created in this manner, and it received its name in honour of the fact that Zalim Singh belonged to the Jhala clan of Chandravanshi. The districts thus severed from Kotah represented one-third (£120,000) of the income of Kotah; by treaty, the new royal family acknowledged the suzerainty of the British and agreed to pay an annual tribute of £8000. Madan Singh, heir of Zalim Singh, received the title of Maharaja Rana, and was placed on the same footing as the other chiefs in Rajputana.

Maharaja Madan Singh, first ruler of independent Jhalawar, died in 1845. An adopted son of his successor took the name of Zalim Singh in 1875 on becoming chief of Jhalawar. He was a minor and was not invested with governing powers till 1884. Owing to his maladministration, his relations with the British government became strained, and he was finally deposed in 1896, "on account of persistent misgovernment and proved unfitness for the powers of a ruling chief." He went to live at Varanasi, on a pension of £2,000 and the administration was placed in the hands of the British resident.

After much consideration, the British resolved in 1897 to break up the state, restoring the greater part to Kota, but forming the two districts of Shahabad and the Chaumahla into a new state of area , which came into existence in 1899, and of which Kunwar Bhawani Singh, a descendant of the original Zalim Singh, was appointed chief. The population of the state was 90,175 in 1901, with an estimated revenue of £26,000 and a tribute of £2000.

Rulers
The rulers were entitled to a 17 gun salute by the British authorities, and were ruled by the Jhala clan of Rajputs.

See also
Political integration of India

References

Jhalawar district
Princely states of Rajasthan
1838 establishments in India
1949 disestablishments in India
Rajputs